The 2017 World Para Swimming Championships was an international swimming competition for athletes with a disability. It was held in Mexico City, Mexico and took place from 2 to 7 December. Around 304 athletes from around 70 different countries competed at the games, with China topping the tables with most gold medals and medals won. The event was held at the Alberca Olímpica Francisco Márquez located in Mexico City. However, due to safety concerns, both Great Britain and Russia withdrew from the rearranged championships.

Venue 

The Championship was staged at the Alberca Olímpica Francisco Márquez located at Mexico City, Mexico.

Events

Classification 

Athletes are allocated a classification for each event based upon their disability to allow fairer competition between athletes of similar ability. The classifications for swimming are:
 Visual impairment
 S11-S13
 Intellectual impairment
 S14
 Other disability
 S1-S10 (Freestyle, backstroke and butterfly)
 SB1-SB9 (breaststroke)
 SM1-SM10 (individual medley)
Classifications run from S1 (severely disabled) to S10 (minimally disabled) for athletes with physical disabilities, and S11 (totally blind) to S13 (legally blind) for visually impaired athletes. Blind athletes must use blackened goggles.

Schedule

Medal table 
The medal table at the end of the championship.

Multiple medallists 
Many competitors won multiple medals at the 2017 Championships. The following athletes won five gold medals or more.

Records 
Multiple world and continental records were broken during the competition. The below table lists the number of records broken by country.

Legend
 WR: World record, CR: Championship record, AF: Africa record, AM: Americas record, AS: Asian record, EU: European record, OS: Oceania record

Footnotes 
 Notes

 References

External links 
 

 
2017 in swimming
2017 in Mexican sports
World Para Swimming Championships
International aquatics competitions hosted by Mexico
Swimming competitions in Mexico
December 2017 sports events in Mexico